The Uruguay Sevens, branded as Seven Punta, is an annual international rugby sevens tournament. Currently held in the capital Montevideo, it was hosted as the Punta del Este Sevens in the resort city of the same name for three decades from 1989 onwards. The tournament retains that history in its branding.

The event was formerly part of the IRB Sevens World Series for the inaugural season in 2000. In recent years it has been part of the Sudamérica Sevens Series and the World Sevens Challenger Series.

The tournament is organised by the Old Boys Club, usually in January or February. It attracts the participation of clubs from Uruguay and neighboring countries such as Argentina, as well as selected provincial and national teams.

Internationally, it is the highest profile Uruguayan rugby event, and has attracted players of the calibre of Jonah Lomu in the past, as well as teams like Fiji, Argentina, New Zealand, Samoa and Belgium Barbarians

International sevens
The tournament was first played in 1989 and featured mostly club teams from Uruguay and Argentina in the early years. Its history as an international event grew in the 1990s when many of the best players and teams in the world travelled to Uruguay for the Seven Punta.

International 7s and World Series: 1993 to 2001
The inaugural Punta del Este International Sevens tournament in 1993 attracted teams from Australia, France, England and New Zealand, as well as neighbours Argentina and Paraguay, plus Uruguay itself as host. The final was won by New Zealand, defeating Australia in a closely fought match by 26–19. Other national teams including Fiji, Tonga and Samoa were added to the field in subsequent years as the tournament grew in status. Punta del Este was included as a stop on the 1999–2000 World Sevens Series but was dropped from the tour after the inaugural season. After one further event in 2001, won by Argentina who defeated New Zealand by 26–21 in the final, the international sevens at Punta del Este ceased.

Key:Dark blue line indicates a tournament included in the World Rugby Sevens Series.

Select teams events: 2005 and 2012
After the tournament was restarted in 2003 as an event for club teams, some national and invitational sides began to be attracted back to play against the clubs, and occasionally a parallel international tournament was included again at the Punta del Este Sevens. The first was an IRB satellite competition in 2005 which included several national teams. In 2012, an all-selection tournament for national and invitational teams was played, with Argentina defeating South Africa's academy to win the final.

International sevens: 2017 onward
From 2017 to 2019 the Seven Punta was included on the annual Sudamérica Rugby Sevens series, and contested by selected international teams. In 2020 the tournament was part of the World Sevens Challenger Series. It was relocated for the first time to Montevideo but kept the Seven Punta name. Japan won the cup final in 2020, defeating host nation Uruguay in extra time.

Key:

Light blue line indicates a tournament included in the Sudamérica Rugby Sevens series.

Green line indicates a tournament included in the World Rugby Sevens Challenger Series.

Club and invitational tournament

Early years: 1989 to 1992
The first four tournaments featured mainly South American club teams although host club Old Boys organised an invitational team known as "Anzacs Old Boys" which won the Cup in 1991 and 1992. That team featured notable players from Australia and New Zealand, including John Eales, Jason Little, Eric Rush and Frank Bunce alongside players such as South American representative Gabriel Travaglini. In 1993 the tournament became the Punta del Este International Sevens and featured selected national teams from around the world.

Gold Cup: 2003 onwards
 Following a one year hiatus after the international sevens had ended in 2001, the event was restarted in 2003 as a tournament for club teams in a return to roots. For the fourteen seasons from 2003 to 2016, the tournament was contested mainly by club teams, but with the occasional national representative selections and sponsored invitational teams entered in the same division. Since 2017, club teams have competed in a separate division to international selections.

A Gold Cup is awarded to the champion team. Silver and Bronze Cups were usually awarded to teams winning the lower bracket playoffs, although the minor placings in the top bracket were given recognition in 2017.

Notes

References

Bibliography
 Bath, Richard (ed.) The Complete Book of Rugby (Seven Oaks Ltd, 1997 )

External links

  2019 Seven Punta site
  2017 Seven Punta site
 

 Incredible fightback sees Uruguay home on RWC Sevens. 2008.

 
International rugby union competitions hosted by Uruguay
Former World Rugby Sevens Series tournaments
Punta del Este
1989 establishments in Uruguay
Rugby sevens competitions in South America
Recurring sporting events established in 1989